The UNESCO World Heritage Site Shrines and Temples of Nikkō encompasses 103 buildings or structures and the natural setting around them. It is located in Nikkō, Tochigi Prefecture, Japan. The buildings belong to two Shinto shrines (Futarasan Shrine and Tōshō-gū) and one Buddhist temple (Rinnō-ji). Nine of the structures are designated National Treasures of Japan while the remaining 94 are Important Cultural Properties. UNESCO listed the site as World Heritage in 1999.

Nominated properties

Futarasan Shrine
23 structures of the Futarasan Shrine are included in the nomination. All are registered Important Cultural Properties. They are:

Tōshō-gū 東照宮
42 buildings of the Tōshō-gū shrine are included in the nomination. Eight structures are registered National Treasures of Japan and 34 are Important Cultural Properties.

Rinnō-ji
38 buildings of Rinnō-ji temple are included in the nomination. One structure, comprising the Honden, Ainoma and Haiden of the Taiyuin Mausoleum, is a registered National Treasure of Japan and 37 are Important Cultural Properties.

Cultural Landscape
Included in the nomination are the forested mountain slopes on which the buildings are located. The dominating cedar forest was planted in the early 17th century during the construction of the Tōshō-gū. The area where buildings are located is designated as Historic Site. Other parts of the Cultural Landscape are protected within the Nikkō National Park.

See also 
Tourism in Japan
 List of World Heritage Sites in Japan

References

External links 
 Shrines and Temples of Nikko in English

World Heritage Sites in Japan
Religious buildings and structures in Tochigi Prefecture
Tourist attractions in Tochigi Prefecture

id:Kuil Buddha dan Shinto di Nikkō